The Horse Mesa Dam is a concrete thin arch dam located in the Superstition Mountains, northeast of Phoenix in Maricopa County, Arizona.

The dam includes three conventional hydroelectric generating units totaling 32 megawatts (MW) and a pumped-storage unit with a capacity of 97 MW.

The dam and associated infrastructure were listed on the National Register of Historic Places in 2017.

A few homes are nearby for temporary employee housing. Its name is derived from when sheep-herders used to graze their saddle and pack animals on the mesa when they were driving their flocks through the area.

Reservoir
The dam forms Apache Lake as it impounds the Salt River. The dam and reservoir are located downstream from the Theodore Roosevelt Dam, and upstream from the Mormon Flat Dam.

References

External links

 SRP Horse Mesa Dam
 

Dams in Arizona
Hydroelectric power plants in Arizona
Dams on the Salt River (Arizona)
Buildings and structures in Maricopa County, Arizona
United States Bureau of Reclamation dams
Dams completed in 1927
Historic American Engineering Record in Arizona
National Register of Historic Places in Maricopa County, Arizona
Dams on the National Register of Historic Places in Arizona